Mohamed Lamin Kamara (born 1943) is a former Sierra Leonean politician. Kamara served as foreign minister from 1992 to 1993.  Under the Ahmed Tejan Kabbah administration, he was the deputy foreign minister.

References

1943 births
Living people
Sierra Leonean Muslims
Foreign Ministers of Sierra Leone